Coldwater fish can have different meanings in different contexts.

In the context of aquariums, it refers to fish species that do not require a heater to remain within tolerable temperatures in a typical indoor aquarium. However, most or all ornamental fish species are able to tolerate temperatures as low as or lower than room temperature, with most stenothermic tropical species having critical thermal minimums of around 10-12 °C. Although these fish are capable of surviving in unheated aquaria, their temperature preferences may vary. For example, koi, goldfish, and pond loaches are commonly considered to be cold-water fish because of their ability to survive at very low temperatures, but their temperature preferences and/or physiological optimal temperatures are 32 °C (90 °F), 24-31 °C (75-88 °F), and 26-28 °C (79-82 °F), respectively. Because many of the ornamental fish considered to be “coldwater fish” are more accurately eurythermal fish and many prefer temperatures similar to, or even warmer than those preferred by certain tropical fish, the term “coldwater fish” in the aquarium context often misleads pet owners into keeping fish below their preferred temperature.

Anglers also may loosely break down fish into categories of warm-water fish, cool-water fish, and cold-water fish. Warm-water fish are species that tend to dwell in relatively warm water, and in North America include species such as largemouth bass, sunfish, and bullhead catfish. Cool-water species, such as smallmouth bass and walleye, can tolerate a wide range of temperatures, but tend to be most abundant in cooler rivers or deeper parts of ponds and lakes. Cold-water species, such as char, trout, salmon, grayling, and burbot become stressed at high temperatures and are most active in cold water. Because these designations are informal, different authorities may recognize different boundaries in temperature preference between the categories.

Freshwater aquarium fish

Southern redbelly dace
Lepomis
Shubunkin
Comet goldfish
Common goldfish
Fancy goldfish
Black telescope 
Fantail goldfish 
Oranda
Ryukin 
Weather loach
White Cloud Mountain minnow
Celestial Pearl Danio
Buenos Aires tetra
Gold barb
Rosy barb
Odessa barb
Fathead minnow
Banded corydoras
Chinese high fin banded shark
Three-spined stickleback
Ticto barb
Pygmy sunfish
Enneacanthus
Texas cichlid
Paradise fish
Green barb
Zebra danio
Bengal danio 
Leopard danio
Danio tinwini
Bulldog pleco
Rhinogobius
Desert goby
Highland swordtail (Xiphophorus malinche)
Japanese ricefish
Zacco
Black lined loach (Yasuhikotakia nigrolineata)
Red shiner (Cyprinella lutrensis)
Spotted gar
Longnose gar
Rosy red minnow
Hillstream loach
Spined loach
Stone loach
Common minnow
Vietnamese cardinal minnow
GM glowing medaka
Gobio
Amur bitterling
Rosy bitterling
Light's bitterling
Deep bodied bitterling
Rainbow shiner (Notropsis chromosus)
Black shark (not to be confused with the tropical red tailed black shark)
Golden cobra snakehead
Dwarf snakehead
Rainbow snakehead
Spotted snakehead (Channa punctata)
Pearl danio
Northern snakehead
Chinese algae eater
Variable platyfish

Note: The above contains a mix of true coldwater fish and sub-tropical fish that can survive and thrive at room temperature which ranges from 15 °C (59 °F) and to 30 °C (86 °F).

Freshwater pond fish

Three-spined stickleback
Nine-spined stickleback
Common goldfish
Shubunkin
Sterlet
Koi
Golden orfe
Blue orfe
Bitterling
Gobio
Grass carp
Albino grass carp
Fathead minnow
Rosy red minnow
Mirror carp
Common carp
Golden rudd
Green tench
Golden tench
Channel catfish
Golden rainbow trout
Roach
Bluegill
Pumpkinseed
Weather loach
Stone loach
Spined loach
Common minnow

Marine aquarium fish

Garibaldi
Catalina goby
Zebra Catalina goby (Lythrypnus zebra)
Ornate boxfish
Shaw's boxfish
White bar boxfish
Truncate coralfish
Blue devil
Pot bellied seahorses

Wild fish
The term is also used to refer to fish species in the wild (such as lake trout, Arctic char, and Arctic grayling), that prefer colder waters.

See also
List of freshwater aquarium fish species

References

Marine Aquarium Fish - http://www.oregonreef.com/sub_coldwater.htm

Freshwater Aquarium Fish - Practical Fishkeeping Magazine

Freshwater Pond Fish - An Essential Guide to Choosing Your Pond Fish and Aquatic Plants by Graham Quick and also http://www.pondexpert.co.uk/ChoosingTheRightFishForYourPond.html

External links
About.com

Aquariums